Janet McNaughton (born November 29, 1953) is a writer from Newfoundland and Labrador. She wrote the coming of age novel, An Earthly Knight, published in 2003.

Life
She was born in Toronto, Ontario and stayed there for 26 years, moving to St. John's in 1979.

Janet McNaughton got into writing early. She was only fifteen when she began to write her first book. It was a historical novel intended for a young readers. She did not finish it. However, the writing helped her to identify her interest, a love for learning about people's lifestyles and thoughts in the past. She pursued this interest by studying folklore in university. She went on to complete a Ph.D in Folklore.

Her novel An Earthly Knight drew inspiration from two ancient ballads: Tam Lin and Lady Isabel and the Elf Knight.

Awards
McNaughton has been awarded the Violet Downey National Chapter of the IODE Book Award for the best Canadian English Language Children's Book, the Ann Connor Brimer Award for Children's Literature in Atlantic Canada, and the Geoffrey Bilson Award for Historical Fiction for Young People. She also received the Mr. Christie's Book Award for The Secret Under My Skin and was short-listed for a Governor General's Literary Award in 1988.

References

External links
 

1953 births
Living people
Canadian children's writers
Writers from St. John's, Newfoundland and Labrador
Writers from Toronto
21st-century Canadian novelists
21st-century Canadian women writers